Prva Liga Telekom may refer to:

Prva Liga Telekom Slovenije, a top-division Slovenian football league
Prva Liga Telekom Srbija, a second-division of Serbian football league